Aortopulmonary window (APW) refers to a congenital heart defect similar in some ways to persistent truncus arteriosus. Persistent truncus arteriosus involves a single valve; aortopulmonary window is a septal defect.

A large number of patients with a large APW usually die within 1 year of age. It is extremely rare to find cases of APW surviving till adult age and it is still rare to surgically treat such patients who are incidentally detected in adult age because such subsets of patients invariably have associated pulmonary vascular obstructive disease in advanced stage and thus there is therapeutic dilemma to surgically correct these patients.

Although cases of uncorrected APW presenting in adulthood have been reported but literature on surgically treated AP window in adult populations is limited. A rare case of successful surgical management of an incidentally detected large APW with reversible pulmonary arterial hypertension has been reported as isolated case reports.

See also
 Aortic window
 Major aortopulmonary collateral artery, develops when native pulmonary circulation is underdeveloped

References

External links 

Radiology
Congenital heart defects